Keown is an Irish surname. The following individuals have the surname:
Anna Gordon Keown (1899–1957), an English author and poet
Dale Keown (b. 1962), Canadian comic book artist
Damien Keown (b. 1951), a prominent bioethicist and authority on Buddhist bioethics
Martin Keown (b. 1966), former English footballer
Mike Keown (b. 1954), an American, Republican member of the Georgia House of Representatives
Wayne Keown (born 1949), American professional wrestler better known as Dutch Mantel and Zeb Colter

Other uses of Keown are:
Keown Station, Pennsylvania, a small community within Allegheny County, Pennsylvania

References